Aamachhodingmo is a Rural municipality located within the Rasuwa District of the Bagmati Province of Nepal.
The municipality spans  of area, with a total population of 5,490 according to a 2011 Nepal census.

On March 10, 2017, the Government of Nepal restructured the local level bodies into 753 new local level structures.
The previous Gatlang, Chilime, Goljung and portion of Haku VDCs were merged to form Aamachhodingmo Rural Municipality.
Aamachhodingmo is divided into 5 wards, with Goljung declared the administrative center of the rural municipality.

References

External links
official website of the rural municipality

Rural municipalities in Rasuwa District
Rural municipalities of Nepal established in 2017